This is a list of Drexel Dragons football coaches.

Key

Head coaches

References
From http://www.drexeldragons.com/hof.aspx?hof=493&path=&kiosk= : Tom Grebis served as the head coach of Drexel football from 1961 to 1968. In his time at Drexel, he secured the highest winning percentage among Drexel football coaches (.625). Grebis is also the second-winningest coach in Drexel history, earning 39 victories. He finished with a career record of 39-24-2. Grebis also coached the Drexel team that scored the most points in a season: 206 in 1964. A 1954 graduate from Drexel, Grebis was a star halfback with the Dragons from 1952 to 1954; he served as the team’s co-captain in 1953 and 1954. Grebis was top scorer and pass receiver during the 1952 season, scoring 36 points and receiving nine passes to gain 249 yards.

Lists of college football head coaches

Pennsylvania sports-related lists